"Six Degrees of Separation" is a song by Irish pop rock band The Script, taken from their third studio album, #3 (2012). The song was released as the album's second single on 25 November 2012. The track was written by Danny O'Donoghue, Mark Sheehan, Steve Kipner and Andrew Frampton. The music video for "Six Degrees of Separation" was uploaded to YouTube on 5 November 2012 at a total length of three minutes and fifty-seven seconds. The band performed the song live during Children in Need on 16 November 2012. The band also performed the track live on The Voice of Holland on 7 December 2012, as well as performing "Hall of Fame" with the remaining contestants.

Track listing
 Digital download
 "Six Degrees of Separation" – 3:52

Charts

Weekly charts

Year-end charts

Certifications

Release history

References

2012 singles
The Script songs
2012 songs
Phonogenic Records singles
Songs written by Steve Kipner
Songs written by Danny O'Donoghue
Songs written by Mark Sheehan
Songs written by Andrew Frampton (songwriter)
Music videos directed by Phil Harder